A bhikkhu (Pali: भिक्खु, Sanskrit: भिक्षु, bhikṣu) is an ordained male in Buddhist monasticism. Male and female monastics ("nun", bhikkhunī, Sanskrit bhikṣuṇī) are members of the Sangha (Buddhist community).

The lives of all Buddhist monastics are governed by a set of rules called the prātimokṣa or pātimokkha. Their lifestyles are shaped to support their spiritual practice: to live a simple and meditative life and attain nirvana.

A person under the age of 20 cannot be ordained as a bhikkhu or bhikkhuni but can be ordained as a śrāmaṇera or śrāmaṇērī.

Definition
Bhikkhu literally means "beggar" or "one who lives by alms". The historical Buddha, Prince Siddhartha, having abandoned a life of pleasure and status, lived as an alms mendicant as part of his śramaṇa lifestyle. Those of his more serious students who renounced their lives as householders and came to study full-time under his supervision also adopted this lifestyle. These full-time student members of the sangha became the community of ordained monastics who wandered from town to city throughout the year, living off alms and stopping in one place only for the Vassa, the rainy months of the monsoon season.

In the Dhammapada commentary of Buddhaghoṣa, a bhikkhu is defined as "the person who sees danger (in samsara or cycle of rebirth)" (Pāli:  ikkhatīti: bhikkhu). He therefore seeks ordination to obtain release from it. The Dhammapada states:

Buddha accepted female bhikkhunis after his step-mother Mahapajapati Gotami organized a women's march to Vesāli. and Buddha requested her to accept the Eight Garudhammas. So, Gotami agreed to accept the Eight Garudhammas and was accorded the status of the first bhikkhuni. Subsequent women had to undergo full ordination to become nuns.

Historical terms in Western literature

In English literature before the mid-20th century, Buddhist monks were often referred to by the term bonze, particularly when describing monks from East Asia and French Indochina. This term is derived from Portuguese and French . It is rare in modern literature.

Buddhist monks were once called talapoy or talapoin , itself , ultimately .

The talapoin is a monkey named after Buddhist monks just as the capuchin monkey is named after the Order of Friars Minor Capuchin (who also are the origin of the word cappuccino).

Ordination

Theravada
Theravada monasticism is organized around the guidelines found within a division of the Pāli Canon called the Vinaya Pitaka. Laypeople undergo ordination as a novitiate (śrāmaṇera or sāmanera) in a rite known as the "going forth" (Pali: pabbajja). Sāmaneras are subject to the Ten Precepts. From there full ordination (Pali: upasampada) may take place. Bhikkhus are subject to a much longer set of rules known as the Pātimokkha (Theravada) or Prātimokṣa (Mahayana and Vajrayana).

Mahayana

In the Mahayana monasticism is part of the system of "vows of individual liberation". These vows are taken by monks and nuns from the ordinary sangha, in order to develop personal ethical discipline. In Mahayana and Vajrayana, the term "sangha" is, in principle, often understood to refer particularly to the aryasangha, the "community of the noble ones who have reached the first bhūmi". These, however, need not be monks and nuns.

The vows of individual liberation are taken in four steps. A lay person may take the five upāsaka and upāsikā vows ("approaching virtue"). The next step is to enter the pabbajja or monastic way of life (Skt: pravrajyā), which includes wearing monk's or nun's robes. After that, one can become a samanera or samaneri "novice" (Skt. śrāmaṇera, śrāmaṇeri). The last and final step is to take all the vows of a bhikkhu or bhikkhuni "fully ordained monastic" (Sanskrit: bhikṣu, bhikṣuṇī).

Monastics take their vows for life but can renounce them and return to non-monastic life and even take the vows again later. A person can take them up to three times or seven times in one life, depending on the particular practices of each school of discipline; after that, the sangha should not accept them again. In this way, Buddhism keeps the vows "clean". It is possible to keep them or to leave this lifestyle, but it is considered extremely negative to break these vows.

In Tibet, the upāsaka, pravrajyā and bhikṣu ordinations are usually taken at ages six, fourteen and twenty-one or older, respectively.

In 9th century Japan, the monk Saichō believed the 250 precepts were for the Śrāvakayāna and that ordination should use the Mahayana precepts of the Brahmajala Sutra. He stipulated that monastics remain on Mount Hiei for twelve years of isolated training and follow the major themes of the 250 precepts: celibacy, non-harming, no intoxicants, vegetarian eating and reducing labor for gain. After twelve years, monastics would then use the Vinaya precepts as a provisional or supplemental, guideline to conduct themselves by when serving in non-monastic communities. Tendai monastics followed this practice.

During Japan's Meiji Restoration during the 1870s, the government abolished celibacy and vegetarianism for Buddhist monastics in an effort to secularise them and promote the newly created State Shinto. Japanese Buddhists won the right to proselytize inside cities, ending a five-hundred year ban on clergy members entering cities. Currently, priests (lay religious leaders) in Japan choose to observe vows as appropriate to their family situation. Celibacy and other forms of abstaining are generally "at will" for varying periods of time.

After the Japan–Korea Treaty of 1910, when Japan annexed Korea, Korean Buddhism underwent many changes. Jōdo Shinshū and Nichiren schools began sending missionaries to Korea under Japanese rule and new sects formed there such as Won Buddhism. The Temple Ordinance of 1911 changed the traditional system whereby temples were run as a collective enterprise by the Sangha, replacing this system with Japanese-style management practices in which temple abbots appointed by the Governor-General of Korea were given private ownership of temple property and given the rights of inheritance to such property. More importantly, monks from pro-Japanese factions began to adopt Japanese practices, by marrying and having children.

In Korea, the practice of celibacy varies. The two sects of Korean Seon divided in 1970 over this issue; the Jogye Order is fully celibate while the Taego Order has both celibate monastics and non-celibate Japanese-style priests.

Robes

The special dress of ordained people, referred to in English as robes, comes from the idea of wearing a simple durable form of protection for the body from weather and climate. In each tradition, there is uniformity in the color and style of dress. Color is often chosen due to the wider availability of certain pigments in a given geographical region. In Tibet and the Himalayan regions (Kashmir, Nepal and Bhutan), red is the preferred pigment used in the dyeing of robes. In Myanmar, reddish brown; In India, Sri Lanka and South-East Asia, various shades of yellow, ochre and orange prevail. In China, Korea, Japan and Vietnam, gray or black is common. Monks often make their own robes from cloth that is donated to them.

The robes of Tibetan novices and monks differ in various aspects, especially in the application of "holes" in the dress of monks. Some monks tear their robes into pieces and then mend these pieces together again. Upāsakas cannot wear the "chö-göö", a yellow tissue worn during teachings by both novices and full monks.

In observance of the Kathina Puja, a special Kathina robe is made in 24 hours from donations by lay supporters of a temple. The robe is donated to the temple or monastery and the resident monks then select from their own number a single monk to receive this special robe.

Additional vows in the Mahayana and Vajrayana traditions
In Mahayana traditions, a Bhikṣu may take additional vows not related to ordination, including the Bodhisattva vows, samaya vows and others, which are also open to laypersons in most instances.

Gallery

See also

 Bhante
 Sayadaw
 Ajahn
 Samanera
 Oshō
 Anagarika
 Bhikkhuni
 Unsui

References

Sources

Further reading
 Inwood, Kristiaan. Bhikkhu, Disciple of the Buddha. Bangkok, Thailand: Thai Watana Panich, 1981.  Revised edition. Bangkok: Orchid Press, 2005. .

External links

 The Buddhist Monk's Discipline Some Points Explained for Laypeople
 Thirty Years as a Western Buddhist Monk

 
.
Buddhist titles
Sanskrit words and phrases
Titles and occupations in Hinduism